Herpetopoma pauperculum is a species of sea snail, a marine gastropod mollusk in the family Chilodontidae.

Description
The size of the shell varies between 4 mm and 8 mm.
The small, solid, thick, imperforate shell has a conical shape. It is white, spotted on theribs with blackish-brown. The spire is conical. The sutures are slightly channelled. The five, convex whorls are, encircled by strong spiral ribs, the interstices clathrate, pitted by longitudinal lamellae. The spiral ribs number 3 to 5 on the penultimate, 8 or 9 on the body whorl. The rounded aperture is thickened and crenulate inside. The columella is straight, broad, and not toothed.

Distribution
This marine species occurs off Japan and Korea.

References

External links
 To World Register of Marine Species
 

pauperculum
Gastropods described in 1872